Trawniki is a village in Lublin Voivodeship, east Poland, the site of a World War II concentration camp.

Trawniki may also refer to the following places:
Trawniki, Lesser Poland Voivodeship (south Poland)
Trawniki, Świętokrzyskie Voivodeship (south-central Poland)
Trawniki, Silesian Voivodeship (south Poland)
Trawniki, Opole Voivodeship (south-west Poland)
Trawniki concentration camp
Trawniki men